The USF Health Byrd Alzheimer's Institute is an Alzheimer's disease research center based in Tampa, Florida. The center was founded on July 1, 2002 as an independent, state-funded facility on the vision of former Florida Speaker of the House Johnnie Byrd, whose father suffered from the disease. Today, the Institute is a multi-disciplinary center at the University of South Florida and the world’s largest freestanding diagnostic facility providing comprehensive memory care services in one location.

External links
 USF Health Byrd Alzheimer's Institute main Website
 Institute on Aging funds Alzheimer's Disease Centers
 1004.445 f.s

Alzheimer's disease research
Medical research institutes in Florida